Cranberry Creek is a stream in the U.S. state of Wisconsin. It is a tributary to the Yellow River.

Cranberry Creek was so named for the wild cranberries along its course.

References

Rivers of Juneau County, Wisconsin
Rivers of Wood County, Wisconsin
Rivers of Wisconsin